Spilomelini is a tribe of the species-rich subfamily Spilomelinae in the pyraloid moth family Crambidae. The tribe was erected by Achille Guenée in 1854.

The tribe currently comprises the following 17 genera, altogether containing 133 species:
Aethaloessa Lederer, 1863 (= Chnaura Lederer, 1863)
Ceratarcha Swinhoe, 1894
Cirrhocephalina Munroe, 1995 (= Cirrhocephala Lederer, 1863)
Cnaphalocrocis Lederer, 1863
Eporidia Walker, 1859 (= Eporedia Walker, 1859, = Glaucoda Karsch, 1900)
Geshna Dyar, 1906
Marasmia Lederer, 1863 (= Bradinomorpha Matsumura, 1920, Dolichosticha Meyrick, 1884, Epimima Meyrick, 1886, Lasiacme Warren, 1896, Marasma, Neomarasmia Kalra, David & Banerji, 1967, Prodotaula Meyrick, 1934, Susumia Marumo, 1930)
Marasmianympha Munroe, 1991
Massepha Walker, 1859
Orphanostigma Warren, 1890 (= Orphanostagma J. C. Shaffer & Munroe, 2007)
Palpusia Amsel, 1956
Rhectocraspeda Warren, 1892 (= Pilemia Möschler, 1882, Rapoona Hedemann, 1894, Rapona Schaus, 1940)
Salbia Guenée, 1854 (= Salbiomorpha Snellen, 1875)
Scaptesylodes Munroe, 1976
Siga Hübner, 1820
Spilomela Guenée, 1854
Zeuzerobotys Munroe, 1963 (= Zeurzerobotys Munroe, 1963)

References

Spilomelinae
Moth tribes